Oracle Park is a baseball stadium in the SoMa district of San Francisco, California. Since 2000, it has served as the home stadium of the San Francisco Giants of Major League Baseball. Previously named Pacific Bell Park, SBC Park, and AT&T Park, the stadium's current name was purchased by the Oracle Corporation in 2019.

The stadium stands along the San Francisco Bay; the section of the bay beyond Oracle Park's right field wall is unofficially known as McCovey Cove, in honor of former Giants player Willie McCovey.

Oracle Park has also hosted professional and collegiate American football games. The stadium was the home of the annual college postseason bowl game now known as the Redbox Bowl from its inaugural playing in 2002 until 2013, and also served as the temporary home for the University of California's football team in 2011. Professionally, it was the home of the San Francisco Demons of the XFL and the California Redwoods of the United Football League.

Public transit access to the stadium is provided within San Francisco by Muni Metro or Muni Bus, from the Peninsula and Santa Clara Valley via Caltrain, and from parts of the Bay Area across the water via various ferries of San Francisco Bay. The Muni 2nd and King Station is directly outside the ballpark, the 4th & King Caltrain station is 1.5 blocks from the stadium, and the Oracle Park Ferry Terminal is outside the eastern edge of the ballpark beyond the center field bleachers.

History

Design and construction
Originally designed to be a 42,000-seat stadium, there were slight modifications before the final design was complete. When the ballpark was brought to the ballot box in the fall of 1996 for voter approval, the stadium was 15° clockwise from its current position. The center-field scoreboard was atop the right-field wall, with the Giants Pavilion Building being in two separate buildings.
Groundbreaking on the ballpark began on December 11, 1997, in the industrial waterfront area of San Francisco known as China Basin in the up-and-coming neighborhoods of South Beach and Mission Bay. The stadium cost $357 million to build and supplanted the Giants' former home, Candlestick Park, a multi-use stadium in southeastern San Francisco that was also home to the NFL's San Francisco 49ers until 2014, when they relocated to Levi's Stadium in Santa Clara. A team of engineers from UC Davis was consulted in the design process of the park, resulting in wind levels that are approximately half those at Candlestick. But due to Oracle Park's location at San Francisco Bay, cold fog and temperatures in summer months are still not unusual at Giants games, despite reduced wind levels.

When it opened on March 31, 2000, the ballpark was the first MLB ballpark built without public funds since the completion of Dodger Stadium in 1962. However, the Giants did receive a $10 million tax abatement from the city and $80 million for upgrades to the local infrastructure (including a connection to the Muni Metro). The Giants have a 66-year lease on the  ballpark site, paying $1.2 million in rent annually to the San Francisco Port Commission. The park opened with a seating capacity of 40,800, but this has increased over time as seats have been added. In April 2010, the stadium became the first MLB ballpark to receive LEED Silver Certification for Existing Buildings, Operations and Maintenance.

Following the 2019 season, the organization began the process of relocating the bullpens from the first and third base foul lines to behind the outfield walls in center and right-centerfield. The motivation was two-fold: to address player safety issues that had arisen over the years by having the bullpen mounds in the field of play, and to slightly alter the dimensions of the park to perhaps increase, if ever-so-slightly, the potential for home runs in certain areas of the outfield, most notably in right-center field, affectionately known as Triples Alley (a design feature meant as an homage to the centerfield depth of the Giants former home in New York, The Polo Grounds). Prior to these modifications, multiple players both home and away had experienced various levels of injury sustained by tripping over the bullpen mounds while chasing foul balls. Most notably, former Giants outfield prospect Mac Williamson sustained a concussion during such a play that significantly altered his season.

Naming rights

On April 3, 1996, Pacific Bell, a telephone company serving California based in San Francisco, purchased the naming rights for the planned ballpark for $50 million for 24 years. The stadium was named Pacific Bell Park, or Pac Bell Park for short.

Just days before the sponsorship was announced, SBC Communications had announced their intention to acquire Pacific Bell's parent company, Pacific Telesis, a deal which closed in April 1997. SBC eventually stopped using the Pacific Bell name for marketing, and reached an agreement with the Giants to change the stadium's name to SBC Park on January 1, 2004.

After SBC bought AT&T Corporation on November 18, 2005, the name of the merged company became AT&T Inc. As a result, in 2006 the stadium was given its third name in six years: AT&T Park.

On January 9, 2019, it was reported that AT&T had given the Giants the option of ending the naming deal a year early, if the team could quickly find a new partner. The Giants and Oracle Corporation came to a rapid agreement, with the old AT&T Park signs being replaced with temporary Oracle Park banners on January 10.

2020 renovations
The Giants renovated the center field section of Oracle Park between October 2019 and June 2020. The bullpens were moved from foul territory into center field, so the Giants decided to make their garden smaller to fit the bullpens behind the center-field wall. With this renovation, the dimensions of the park have slightly shrunk. Left-center was trimmed down from 404 feet to 399 feet, right-center (known as Triples Alley) was trimmed down from 421 feet to 415 feet (to represent the San Francisco area code), and dead-center was trimmed down from 399 feet to 391 feet, making it the second shortest dead-center field distance in MLB, behind only Fenway Park in Boston. With this renovation, approximately 650 bleacher seats had to be removed, so the two terraces could be built for fans to watch the relief pitchers warm-up from up close. The center field wall shortened from eight feet to seven feet, but after the Giants first exhibition of the 2020 season, the dead-center field part of the wall (covering the garden) was raised from seven feet to ten feet to improve visibility to the hitter.

Despite having the unique moniker of the least home-run friendly field over several seasons prior to the renovations, it is believed that these renovations were made to increase home run output from the Giants. The MLB has seen a surge in home run production in recent years, and the Giants consistently ranked well towards the bottom in this category in large part because of Oracle Park's extreme advantage to pitchers. This hurt the run production of Giants players and also discouraged power hitters from wanting to play for the Giants. From 2017 to 2019, one of the common criticisms of the Giants was their lack of offensive output and unwillingness to adjust to a home run-heavy offense. However, the Giants significantly improved in 2020, the first year the dimensions were moved in. Things would trend upward with a massive bounce-back season in 2021; several Giants such as Brandon Belt and Mike Yastrzemski fueled the offense with more home runs, especially to a shortened triple's alley (which was infamous for turning what would be a long HR in several ballparks into deep 420-foot+ flyouts, killing several promising San Francisco scoring opportunities in the past). Oracle Park still ranks towards the bottom of the home run category, but this designation is not as consistent anymore.

Features

The stadium contains 68 luxury suites, 5,200 club seats on the club level, and an additional 1,500 club seats at the field level behind home plate.

On the facing of the upper deck along the left-field line are the retired numbers of Bill Terry, Mel Ott, Carl Hubbell, Monte Irvin, Will Clark, Willie Mays, Barry Bonds, Juan Marichal, Orlando Cepeda, Jackie Robinson, Willie McCovey, and Gaylord Perry, as well as the retired uniforms, denoted "NY", of Christy Mathewson and John McGraw who played or managed in the pre-number era. These two pre-number–era retired uniforms are among only six such retired uniforms in all of the Major Leagues.

Oracle Park has a reputation of being a pitcher's park and the most pitcher-friendly ballpark in the National League, because the depth of the outfield limits home runs, according to ESPN. ESPN's MLB Park Factors lists Oracle Park as having the fewest home runs per game 6 out of the past 7 years, the one exception coming in 2013, when it was the 3rd lowest.

Right field and McCovey Cove

Because of the proximity to the San Francisco Bay, the right-field foul pole is only  from home plate, the shortest in the NL [only AL Fenway Park's is shorter, at ]. The wall is made of brick, with fenced-off archways opening to the Cove beyond, above which are several rows of arcade seating. Atop the fence are four fountain pillars. Jets of water burst from the four pillars at the end of the National Anthem, as well as when the Giants hit a home run or win a game.

The right field area was designed to resemble the Polo Grounds. This deep corner of the ballpark has been dubbed "Death Valley" and "Triples Alley." Like its Polo Grounds counterpart, it is very difficult to hit a home run to this area, and a batted ball that finds its way into this corner often results in a triple. Triples Alley is also infamous for bad bounces, most notably when Ichiro Suzuki hit the first-ever inside-the-park home run in an All-Star Game by lining the ball off one of the archways and sideways past the outfielders. Nate Schierholtz performed the same feat in the 2009 season as a pinch hitter. Aubrey Huff did it again in the 2010 season, as did Conor Gillaspie in 2011. Ángel Pagán ended a game in May 2013 with a two-run walk-off (extra-inning, come-from-behind) inside-the-park home run, the first of its kind at the then-named AT&T Park.

Beyond right field is China Basin, a section of San Francisco Bay, which is dubbed McCovey Cove after famed Giants first baseman and left-handed slugger Willie McCovey, and into which a number of home runs have been hit on the fly. As of September 2, 2022, 96 "splash hits" have been knocked into the Cove by Giants players since the park opened; 35 of those were hit by Barry Bonds, who remains the only player to record two splash hits in the same game. The most recent splash hit occurred on September 2, 2022, by Joc Pederson. These hits are tallied on an electronic counter on the right field wall. Opponents have hit the water on the fly 55 times; Todd Hundley of the Los Angeles Dodgers was the first visitor to do so on June 30, 2000. Curtis Granderson, Luis Gonzalez, Cliff Floyd, and Max Muncy are the only visiting players to do so twice. Carlos Delgado and Adam LaRoche have performed the feat thrice. Bryson Stott is the most recent visiting player to record a splash hit, doing so on September 3, 2022. On June 27, 2010, David Ortiz became the first American League player to hit a splash hit. Since then, the only other AL players who have are Mitch Moreland, Adam Dunn, Rougned Odor, and Shin-Soo Choo.

Behind the scoreboard in center field is a pier where ferries let fans 
off at the park. On game days, fans take to the water of McCovey Cove in boats often with fishing nets in the hope of collecting a home run ball. Just beyond the wall, behind the King Street ballpark, is a public waterfront promenade. Across the cove from the ballpark is McCovey Point and China Basin Park, featuring monuments to past Giants legends.

Rusty, the Coke bottle, and the glove
The Santa Clarita-based firm Technifex engineered, fabricated and programmed Rusty to appear after major plays during games as a fully animated giant 1920s-era tin toy. After technical problems arose with Rusty, it was removed from the wall, though the enclosure that housed him remained for years. In 2008, the enclosure was removed to make way for luxury boxes.

Behind the left field bleachers is "The Coca-Cola Fan Lot". Bubbles originally accompanied the bottle, but never worked as intended and were removed. Directly to the bottle's right from home plate is another oversized representation of a ballpark stalwart, the "Giant 1927 Old-Time Four-Fingered Baseball Glove" — this particular one is made of steel and fiberglass, which is behind the  sign. Behind and farther to the left is "The Little Giants Park", a miniature baseball diamond.

To the right of the glove sculpture is a large plaza area for functions and parties to be held during games. It is also the site of "Orlando's", the concessions stand of Giants great Orlando Cepeda. Right-center field features a retired San Francisco cable car numbered 44 (retired cable car #4, formerly #504) in honor of Giants great Willie McCovey. Originally, the cable car had a label that stated "No Dodgers Fans Allowed", as well as one end of the car numbered 24 in honor of Willie Mays and the other end numbered 44 in honor of Willie McCovey. The foghorn — a feature introduced at Candlestick Park by the current Giants ownership group – was transferred to Oracle and hung underneath the scoreboard. It blows when a Giants player hits a home run or at the conclusion of a Giants win.

@Café

Located behind the centerfield bleachers, the ballpark features the @Café, a social media café, which opened in the 2013 season. The cafe serves Peet's Coffee and features large screens that show off fans' social media posts from Facebook, Twitter, and Instagram, which are curated by the Giants organization.

The cafe replaced a team-themed Build-A-Bear Workshop store, where fans could build their own stuffed Giants' mascot, Lou Seal, or create other Giants-themed stuffed animals.

Scoreboards

In addition to the automated scoreboards, which now include a new HD videoboard by Mitsubishi, the park has a manually-operated scoreboard on the right field wall, which displays all the scores of Major League Baseball games being played elsewhere. The manual scoreboards are operated by three employees, whose work on game days starts at least two hours before the first pitch. A members-only bar, Gotham Club, is located behind the manual scoreboard, complete with a bowling alley and pool tables. Former players and VIPs are the only patrons of this exclusive area. Four other ballparks also use hand-operated out-of-town scoreboards: Fenway Park, Minute Maid Park, Oakland-Alameda County Coliseum and Wrigley Field.

Wireless internet
Starting in 2004, the Giants installed 122 wireless internet access points, covering all concourses and seating areas, creating one of the largest public hotspots in the world at the time.

San Francisco Giants Wall of Fame

On September 23, 2008, the Giants Wall of Fame was unveiled on the King Street side of the ballpark, as part of the 50th-anniversary celebration of the Giants' move to San Francisco. 48 retired players were inducted, based on longevity and achievement. Eligibility requirements for players to be on the Wall are either five years as a San Francisco Giant with an All-Star Game appearance or nine years as a Giant. Rich Aurilia and Shawn Estes were added in 2010. Jason Schmidt and Marvin Benard were added in 2011, and Barry Bonds was added in 2017.

Statues

Outside the ballpark are six statues, five of which are dedicated to San Francisco Giants all-time greats.

The Willie Mays Statue is located in front of the ballpark entrance at 24 Willie Mays Plaza and is surrounded with 24 palm trees, in honor of his number 24 uniform, retired by the Giants. It was dedicated at noon on March 31, 2000, prior to the opening of the ballpark and was commissioned by Giants Managing Partner Peter Magowan

Another statue, located at McCovey Point across McCovey Cove, is dedicated to Willie McCovey. Around the statue are a number of plaques that celebrate the winners of the Willie Mac Award. The statue is located at China Basin Park next to the Barry Bonds Junior Giants Field, a T-ball park. Also located on the sea wall promenade are plaques showing the Opening Day roster of every Giants team from 1958 through 1999. Giants fans who contributed funds to China Basin Park had their own tiles with their own inscriptions set into the wall.

A third statue, dedicated in 2005, honors former Giants pitcher Juan Marichal, and is located outside the ballpark at the Lefty O'Doul Gate entrance.

The fourth and only non-human statue is located at the park's ferry plaza behind center field, also known as Seals Plaza. A statue of a seal bobbing a baseball on its nose honors the memory of the San Francisco Seals, the minor league baseball club that played before the arrival of the Giants in 1958.

On September 6, 2008, during a series against the Pittsburgh Pirates, a fifth statue depicting Giants great Orlando Cepeda was dedicated at the corner of 2nd Street and King Street, next to the ballpark. A sixth statue, dedicated on August 13, 2016, honors former Giants pitcher Gaylord Perry in the same location. All five player statues were created by sculptor William Behrends of North Carolina.

Left field Chevron banner and ground rule issues

One feature of the ballpark is the long-running Chevron advertisement located in left field, featuring an outline of the company's claymation Chevron Cars.  The top 'roofs' of the cars (along with a dog and a surfboard hanging out a car window) are extended out, rendering it several inches higher than the wall base, creating a ground rules issue. Several instances where potential over-the-wall catches to take away home runs were thwarted have occurred because of the advertisement's top dimensions. One notable example of this occurred during Game 3 of the 2016 NLDS against the Chicago Cubs. Kris Bryant hit a ball well into left field, with Giants left fielder Gregor Blanco attempting a catch. The ball landed on the roof of one of the cars, past the wall, and out of his reach, rendering it a home run and tying the game in the top of the ninth inning. (though the Giants would win the game in extra innings for their only win in the series).

Climate

Notable events

2000s
The opening series took place April 11–13, 2000 against the Los Angeles Dodgers (the team the Giants faced in their final series at Candlestick Park), and the Giants were swept in three games. In the first game of that series, the Giants lost 6–5, highlighted by three home runs from the Dodgers' Kevin Elster. On May 1, 2000, Barry Bonds became the first player to hit a "splash hit" home run into McCovey Cove.

In just its first few years of existence, the ballpark saw its share of historic events primarily due to veteran Giants outfielder Barry Bonds. On April 17, 2001, Bonds hit his 500th career home run at then-Pacific Bell Park. Later that year, he set the single season home run record when he hit home runs number 71, 72, and 73 over the weekend of October 5 to close the season. On August 9, 2002, Bonds hit his 600th career home run at the park. On April 12, 2004, Bonds hit career home run 660 at SBC Park to tie Willie Mays for third on the all-time list and on the next night, he hit number 661 to move into sole possession of third place. On September 17, 2004, Bonds hit his 700th career home run at the park to become just the third member of baseball's 700 club. On May 28, 2006, Bonds hit his 715th home run at the park to pass Babe Ruth for second place on the all-time list. On August 7, 2007, Bonds hit his 756th home run, breaking Hank Aaron's record.

The park hosted games three through five of the 2002 World Series against the Anaheim Angels, which the Giants lost four games to three. It also hosted the 2007 MLB All-Star Game, which the American League won 5–4 over the National League.

On July 10, 2009, the Giants' Jonathan Sánchez pitched the first no-hitter.

2010s
On October 27 & 28, 2010, the Giants hosted the first two games of the World Series, beating the Texas Rangers in both games. They ultimately went on to win the series four games to one, their first championship since the team moved to San Francisco in 1958, though the clinching game was played at Rangers Ballpark in Arlington rather than at Oracle Park.

On June 13, 2012, Matt Cain threw the 22nd perfect game in MLB history — and first in Giants history — against the Houston Astros.

Oracle Park hosted Games 1 and 2 of the 2012 World Series on October 24 and 25. The Giants beat the Detroit Tigers twice, 8–3 and 2–0 respectively. The Giants would go on to win the 2012 World Series in a four-game sweep at Comerica Park.

The stadium hosted of the semifinal and final rounds of the 2013 World Baseball Classic on March 17–19.

On July 23, 2013, due to a previous rain-out in Cincinnati, Oracle Park served as the "home" venue of the Cincinnati Reds for the second game of a doubleheader against the Giants. Giants manager Bruce Bochy won his 1,500th career game.

On June 25, 2014, Tim Lincecum pitched the 3rd no-hitter at Oracle Park against the San Diego Padres in a 4–0 win. It was his 2nd no-hitter of his career, with both of them coming against the Padres.

Oracle Park hosted Games 3, 4, and 5 of the 2014 World Series on October 24, 25 and 26. The Giants beat the Kansas City Royals 2 out of the 3 games played at Oracle Park, losing Game 3, 3–2, before winning Games 4 and 5, 11–4 and 5–0 respectively. They ultimately went on to win the series in seven games, with the clinching game played at Kauffman Stadium rather than at Oracle Park.

On June 15, 2015, the Giants set a record for most consecutive home losses at Oracle Park at nine straight games with a 5–1 loss to the Seattle Mariners. This losing streak was the Giants' longest since an 11-game home loss streak at the Polo Grounds in New York in 1940.

From October 1, 2010, to July 18, 2017, Oracle Park recorded 530 consecutive sellouts, the second longest in Major League history behind Fenway Park's 794 consecutive sellouts from 2003 to 2013.

Non-baseball events
Giants Enterprises, a wholly owned subsidiary of the San Francisco Giants created and headed by longtime team executive Pat Gallagher, brings non-baseball events to Oracle Park on days when the Giants do not play. Prominent among these has been the usage of the stadium for football. It has also hosted a range of other sporting and musical events.

Football
The park was home to the XFL's San Francisco Demons in 2001, was the home of the East-West Shrine Game (until 2006), and was the former home stadium of the California Redwoods of the UFL in 2009.

From 2002 to 2013, it was also home to college football's Redbox Bowl when the game was known as the San Francisco Bowl, Emerald Bowl, and Fight Hunger Bowl. In 2011, Oracle Park became the temporary home football stadium for the California Golden Bears while Cal's on-campus stadium, California Memorial Stadium, underwent renovation.

Oracle Park also hosted its first high school football game in 2011, the Central Coast Section Division III football championship game between long-time San Francisco rivals St. Ignatius College Preparatory and Sacred Heart Cathedral Preparatory.

In January 2019, it was reported that the Oakland Raiders had considered temporarily moving to Oracle Park for the 2019 NFL season, as an interim measure before construction of a stadium in their new home city of Las Vegas was complete for 2020. However, the 49ers refused to waive their territorial rights, and the Raiders would ultimately reach an agreement with the Oakland-Alameda County Coliseum Authority to return to the Oakland Coliseum for the 2019 season with a provision for the 2020 season should construction of Allegiant Stadium be delayed.

Soccer
On February 10, 2006, the U.S. men's soccer team defeated Japan 3–2 at Oracle in a friendly.

A match of the 2011 World Football Challenge between Manchester City and Club America was held at Oracle, drawing a crowd of 11,250.

On March 17, 2012, the Houston Dynamo defeated the San Jose Earthquakes 1–0 in a regular season Major League Soccer match at Oracle.

On July 31, 2013, Everton defeated Juventus 6–5 on penalties after ending regulation tied 1-1 as part of the 2013 International Champions Cup.

Rugby
The stadium hosted the 2018 Rugby World Cup Sevens from July 20 to 22.

Monster Jam
Monster Jam attended the venue for four years in a row from 2004 to 2007. The tracks were usually wet due to the shows being held in the winter, of which rainfall is common on the west coast around those times. Monster Jam would never return to the stadium following 2007 for unknown reasons.

Other events
The stadium hosted an AMA Supercross Championship round from 2003 to 2010.

The Mavericks big-wave surfing contest is broadcast live on the giant video display at Oracle Park when the event is held. In 2006, the park hosted ICER AIR the first stadium big-air ski and snowboard competition to be held in the United States.

San Francisco Opera partnered with Giants Enterprises to do three broadcasts, most recently Tosca, in June and September 2009.

In summer 2010, the park hosted an audition stop for the 2011 (10th) season of American Idol.

In October 2013, rapper Kanye West rented out the stadium and the scoreboard for a private event, which turned out to be an elaborate marriage proposal to his girlfriend, reality personality Kim Kardashian.

Starting in 2015, the stadium began hosting commencement exercises for San Francisco State University.

During the finale of The Amazing Race 30, the park was the first location visited by teams after they arrived in San Francisco, with teams having to find a clue next to the Willie Mays Statue and then kayaking for baseballs in McCovey Cove.

American singer-songwriter and actress, Lady Gaga, headlined Oracle Park on two occasions, once in 2017 on her Joanne World Tour, and again in 2022 during The Chromatica Ball.

See also

 49-Mile Scenic Drive
 Sports in the San Francisco Bay Area
 Chase Center

References

External links

Oracle Park official website on MLB.com
William Behrends sculptures at AT&T Park
Oracle Park Seating Chart

2000 establishments in California
American football venues in San Francisco
Baseball venues in California
California Golden Bears football venues
Defunct NCAA bowl game venues
United Football League (2009–2012) venues
Leadership in Energy and Environmental Design basic silver certified buildings
Major League Baseball venues
Multi-purpose stadiums in the United States
Oracle Corporation
Parks in San Francisco
Rugby union stadiums in San Francisco
Sacramento Mountain Lions stadiums
San Francisco Demons
San Francisco Giants stadiums
Soccer venues in San Francisco
South of Market, San Francisco
Sports venues completed in 2000
Sports venues in San Francisco
XFL (2001) venues
Populous (company) buildings
World Baseball Classic venues